Forster and Andrews was a British organ building company between 1843 and 1924. 

The company was formed by James Alderson Forster (1818–1886) and Joseph King Andrews (1820–1896), who had been employees of the London organ builder J. C. Bishop. They opened the business that bore their name in Hull in 1843. The business developed and became one of the most successful of the North of England organ builders. It was taken over by John Christie in 1924 and finally wound up in 1956. As well as their Hull headquarters, the company had branches in London and York. 

The German builder Edmund Schulze (1823–1878), an influence on Forster and Andrews, used to recommend them to prospective clients when he was unable to accept commissions.

List of organs

References

 Laurence Elvin, Forster and Andrews, Their barrel, chamber, and small church organs

Pipe organ building companies
Defunct companies of Kingston upon Hull
Organ builders of the United Kingdom